Baghdad Eyalet was an Iraqi eyalet of the Ottoman Empire centered on Baghdad.

History 
Safavid shah Ismail I took the Baghdad region from the Aq Qoyunlu in 1508. After the Safavid takeover, Sunni Muslims, Jews and Christians became targets of persecution, and were killed for being infidels. In addition, Shah Ismail ordered the destruction of the grave of Abu Hanifa, founder of the Hanafi school of law which the Ottomans adopted as their official legal guide.

In 1534, Baghdad was captured by the Ottoman Empire, and the eyalet was established in 1535. Between 1623 and 1638, it was once again in Iranian hands. It was decisively recaptured by the Ottomans in 1638, whose possession over Iraq was agreed upon in the 1639 Treaty of Zuhab.

For a time, Baghdad had been the largest city in the Middle East. The city saw relative revival in the latter part of the 18th century under a largely autonomous Mamluk government. Direct Ottoman rule was reimposed by Ali Ridha Pasha in 1831. From 1851 to 1852 and from 1861 to 1867, Baghdad was governed, under the Ottoman Empire by Mehmed Namık Pasha. The Nuttall Encyclopedia reports the 1907 population of Baghdad as 185,000.

Administrative divisions 
Sanjaks of Baghdad Eyalet in the 17th century:

References

See also 
 Ottoman Iraq
 List of Ottoman governors of Baghdad

Ottoman Iraq
Eyalets of the Ottoman Empire in Asia
1535 establishments in the Ottoman Empire
1864 disestablishments in the Ottoman Empire